The year 1925 saw a number of significant events in radio broadcasting history.


Events
1 January – In Sweden, AB Radiotjänst (forerunner of Sveriges Radio) broadcasts its first programme.
27 January – Australia's second oldest surviving radio station, 2HD, goes on air for the first time in Newcastle, New South Wales.
1 February – The Polish Radiotechnical Society (Polskie Towarzystwo Radiotechniczne, PTR) makes its first official broadcast from Warsaw.
22 February – First radio transmission of a religious service in Denmark, from the Garrison Church, Copenhagen.
4 March – Second inauguration of Calvin Coolidge as President of the United States, the first inauguration to be broadcast.
8 March – Westinghouse Electric, owner of KDKA among other stations, announces from its Pittsburgh headquarters a proposal to form "radio networks" via shortwave technology.
22 March – JOAK, NHK Radio One of Tokyo, an official inauguration service start, and a first license radio station in Japan. 
1 April – In Denmark, Radioordningen (Statsradiofonien from 1926, Danmarks Radio from 1959) is established.
23 April – KRO (the Katholieke Radio Omroep) is established in the Netherlands.
1 June – JOBK, NHK Radio One of Osaka, an official inauguration service start in Japan.
17 June – In Spain, Unión Radio opens station EAJ-7 Radio Madrid.
7 July – Inauguration in France of state radio station Marseille PTT.
15 July – JOCK, NHK Radio One of Nagoya, an official inauguration service start in Japan.
27 July – The British Broadcasting Company's Daventry transmitting station on Borough Hill, Daventry in central England opens as the world's first longwave broadcast radio transmitter, taking over from its Chelmsford facility.
25 September – The Berliner Funkturm (Berlin Radio Tower) begins transmissions.
1 November – VARA (the Vereeniging van Arbeiders Radio Amateurs) is established in the Netherlands.
16 December – Colombo Radio launches in Ceylon, origin of Radio Ceylon.

Debuts
14 January – First broadcast on Swedish national radio (AB Radiotjänst) of one of the world's longest-running radio programmes, Barnens brevlåda ("Children's letterbox"), which will run for 1,785 editions – all presented by "Uncle Sven" (the radio sports commentator Sven Jerring) – until 1972.
21 March – Lowell Thomas is first heard on the radio on Pittsburgh station KDKA.
31 March – Radio station WOWO in Fort Wayne, Indiana begins broadcasting.
8 April – Station WADC commences regular programming in Akron, Ohio. It had debuted earlier (in February 1925) as a temporary station during a car show held at the Central Garage, the call letters standing for the station's sponsor, the Automotive Dealers Company. Known from 2 June 2005 as WARF, it becomes Akron's oldest surviving radio station.
23 September – In Decatur IL, WJBL signs on, now referred to as WSOY.
4 October – The Atwater Kent Hour debuts on WEAF and 10 other connected stations. 
5 October – WSM signs on in Nashville, Tennessee.
15 November – First transmission from Radio RV-10 in the Byelorussian Soviet Socialist Republic (modern-day Belarus).
28 November – The weekly country music-variety program Grand Ole Opry is first broadcast on WSM radio in Nashville, Tennessee, as the "WSM Barn Dance".
24 December – KMOX begins broadcasting in St. Louis, Missouri.

Closings
April – WGI-Medford Hillside, Massachusetts declares bankruptcy and shuts down for good; this leaves WBZ-Springfield as the oldest surviving station in New England.
Undated – WAAB 1150 AM ceases broadcasting. 1150 AM will return the next year as WJBO.

Births
17 February – Joy Nichols, Australian-born musical comedy performer (d. 1992)
2 April – Hans Rosenthal, German radio editor, director and media host (d. 1987)
25 April – Janete Clair, Brazilian broadcast play and novel writer (d. 1983)
15 May – Regis Cordic, American radio personality and actor (d. 1999)
25 May – Derek Cooper, English food writer and broadcaster (d. 2014)
15 June – Richard Baker, English broadcaster (d. 2018)
7 July – Wally Phillips, American radio personality (d. 2008)
14 July – Pip Freedman, South African radio comedian and film actor (d. 2003)
8 September – Peter Sellers, English comic actor (d. 1980)
19 September – Pete Murray, English DJ
22 September – William Franklyn, English actor (d. 2006)
28 September – Jerry Clower, American country music comedian (d. 1998)
27 October – Monica Sims, British radio executive (d. 2018)
31 October – Shirley Dinsdale, American ventriloquist (d. 1999)
11 November – June Whitfield, English comic actress (d. 2018)

References

 
Radio by year